Luke John Hendrie (born 7 August 1994) is an English professional footballer who plays as a defender for Bradford City.

He began his career with Premier League side Manchester United and later transferred to both Derby County and Burnley. His time at Turf Moor saw loan spells with Hartlepool United, York City, Kilmarnock and his boyhood club Bradford City, before earning a permanent transfer to Shrewsbury Town and later Grimsby Town. He is a former England U17 international and earned 5 caps in 2010.

Early and personal life
Born in Leeds, West Yorkshire, Hendrie grew up in Menston and attended St Mary's Menston Catholic Voluntary Academy in the village. He comes from a footballing family, with his father John Hendrie who previously played for Bradford City Middlesbrough and Leeds United and his great-uncle Paul Hendrie, who was a former player and manager in the Football League. His father's cousins are former England international Lee Hendrie and former Morecambe striker Stuart Hendrie.

Club career
Hendrie started his career in the youth team with Bradford City before signing for the Academy at Manchester United as a teenager. He progressed through the academy originally starting as a right-back, before forcing himself into his favoured position of central midfield, making 25 appearances and scoring three goals during the 2011–12 season. In July 2012, he signed his first professional contract with Manchester United, agreeing a one-year deal. He managed only 76 minutes of under-21 football during his first year as a professional and was released at the end of the season, having failed to make the breakthrough to the first team.

Following his release he joined Championship club Derby County on trial, eventually signing a two-year contract. He spent the majority of his time with Derby in the Development Squad and he failed to make a first-team appearance and was released in May 2015. He subsequently joined League One club Bradford City on trial during pre-season.

In August 2015, he signed a one-year contract with Championship club Burnley with the option of a further year, having featured against them in a pre-season friendly for Bradford City. In October 2015, having mainly featured for the Development Squad, he signed for League Two club Hartlepool United on an initial one-month loan deal. He made his professional debut in the 1–0 away win over Dagenham & Redbridge, playing the full ninety minutes. He made three appearances for Hartlepool during the month before returning to Burnley.

Hendrie joined League Two club York City on 7 January 2016 on a one-month loan.

On 19 August 2016, Hendrie joined Scottish Premiership club Kimarnock on loan until January 2017. He made his debut a day later, against Ross County. The loan agreement between Burnley and Kilmarnock was subsequently extended to the end of the 2016–17 season.

On 21 August 2017, he signed for League One club Bradford City on loan until January 2018. He made 18 appearances, and left after failing to agree an extension to his loan.

Hendrie signed for League One club Shrewsbury Town on 9 January 2018 on an 18-month contract for an undisclosed fee.

On 18 August 2018, Hendrie joined League Two club Grimsby Town on loan until January 2019. He signed for Grimsby permanently on 11 January 2019 on a two-and-a-half-year contract.

Following Grimsby's relegation from the Football League, Hendrie was offered a new contract but on 15 July 2021 having yet to accept a deal the club officially retracted the offer with manager Paul Hurst stating that he had already gone past several deadlines in order to sign, commenting further that during this period The Mariners had gone on sign two right backs in Michee Efete and Ryan Sears in preparation for the 2021–22 season.

Hendrie signed a contract with Hartlepool United on 30 August 2021. On 31 January 2022, Hendrie had his contract terminated by the club. Later in the day, Hendrie was signed by Bradford City.  He was one of seven players offered a new contract by Bradford City at the end of the 2021–22 season.

International career
Hendrie is eligible to play for England, and Scotland who he qualifies for through his father. In October 2009, he received his first call-up to the England under-16 team for the international friendly against Wales, making his debut in a 1–0 win. He also gained five caps for the under-17 team, making two appearances in the 2011 UEFA European Under-17 Championship qualifiers against Poland and Georgia.

In May 2013, he received a call up to the Scotland under-20 team for a youth tournament in the Netherlands.

Career statistics

References

External links

1994 births
Living people
Footballers from Leeds
People from Menston
English footballers
England youth international footballers
Bradford City A.F.C. players
Manchester United F.C. players
Derby County F.C. players
Burnley F.C. players
Hartlepool United F.C. players
York City F.C. players
Kilmarnock F.C. players
Shrewsbury Town F.C. players
Grimsby Town F.C. players
English Football League players
Scottish Professional Football League players
English people of Scottish descent
Association football midfielders
Association football defenders